Daniel Buckley may refer to:
 Daniel Buckley (1890–1918), Irish survivor of Titanic sinking
 Danny Buckley, Irish hurler
 Domhnall Ua Buachalla (born Daniel Buckley; 1866–1963), Irish politician and governor-general of the Irish Free State